Henry Clark may refer to:

Politicians 
Henry Toole Clark (1808–1874), Governor of North Carolina, 1861–1862
Henry Selby Clark (1809–1869), U.S. Representative from North Carolina
Henry A. Clark (New York politician) (1818–1906), New York politician
Henry Alden Clark (1850–1944), U.S. Representative from Pennsylvania
Henry Maitland Clark (1929–2012), Northern Irish colonial administrator and politician

Others 
Henry Septimus Clark (1835–1864), co-founder of Stonyfell Winery in South Australia
Henry S. Clark (1904–1999), American Hall of Fame racehorse trainer
Henry James Clark (1826–1873), naturalist
Henry Marcus Clark (1859–1913), Australian businessman
Henry Martyn Clark (1857–1916), Afghan-born British medical missionary
Henry Ray Clark (1936–2006), folk artist and criminal
Henry Wallace Clark (1880–1948), American consulting engineer
Henry W. Clark (1899–?), American college football player and coach
Henry Raúl Clark, Honduran footballer for Honduras national football team
Henry Clark, member of the English band The Rumble Strips

See also
Henry Clarke (disambiguation)
Harry Clark (disambiguation)
Henry Clerke (disambiguation)